Conus miniexcelsus, common name Sulu's cone , is a species of sea snail, a marine gastropod mollusc in the family Conidae, the cone snails and their allies.

Like all species within the genus Conus, these snails are predatory and venomous. They are capable of "stinging" humans, therefore live ones should be handled carefully or not at all.

Description
The size of the shell varies between 19 mm and 37 mm.

Distribution
This marine species occurs off the Philippines and Japan.

References

 Biggs, J. S., Watkins, M. Showers Corneli, P. and Olivera, B. M. (2010). Defining a clade by morphological, molecular, and toxinological criteria: distinctive forms related to Conus praecellens A. Adams, 1854 (Gastropoda: Conidae). Nautilus 124:1–19.
 Puillandre N., Duda T.F., Meyer C., Olivera B.M. & Bouchet P. (2015). One, four or 100 genera? A new classification of the cone snails. Journal of Molluscan Studies. 81: 1–23

External links
 The Conus Biodiversity website
 Cone Shells – Knights of the Sea
 

miniexcelsus
Gastropods described in 2010